The 1984 Tournament Players Championship was a golf tournament in Florida on the PGA Tour, held March 29 to April 1 at TPC Sawgrass in Ponte Vedra Beach, southeast of Jacksonville. It was the eleventh Tournament Players Championship. 

Fred Couples, age 24, shot a course record 64 in the second round, and finished at 277, one stroke ahead of runner-up  It was his second win on tour, and he won this championship twelve years later in  Trevino, the champion in 1980 at adjacent Sawgrass Country Club, had missed the cut at the previous two editions, the first two held at the new venue.

Defending champion Hal Sutton finished sixteen strokes back, in a tie for 41st place.

Couples was the youngest champion for twenty years, until Adam Scott won at age 23 in 2004. Sutton had been the youngest, but only for a year; Couples was five months younger at the time of his win.

Eight years later, Couples lowered the course record to 63 in the third round, but finished eight strokes back.

Venue

In response to player concerns, the course had undergone further refinements: greens were flattened and slowed and most of the waste areas were removed.

Eligibility requirements 
Top 125 players, if PGA Tour members, from Final 1983 Official Money List
Designated players
Any foreign player meeting the requirements of a designated player, whether or not he is a PGA Tour member
Winners in the last 10 calendar years of the Tournament Players Championship, PGA Championship, U.S. Open, Masters Tournament and World Series of Golf (beginning in 1976)
The leader in Senior PGA Tour official earnings of 1983
The three players, not otherwise eligible, designated by the TPC Committee as "special selections"
To complete a field of 144 players, those players in order, not otherwise eligible, from the 1984 Official Money List, as of the completion of the Bay Hill Classic, March 19, 1984

Source:

Field
John Adams, Isao Aoki, George Archer, Wally Armstrong, Seve Ballesteros, Dave Barr, Andy Bean, Chip Beck, Ronnie Black, Jim Booros, Bob Boyd, Bill Britton, Mark Brooks, Brad Bryant, George Burns, George Cadle, Rex Caldwell, Chen Tze-chung, Bobby Clampett, Lennie Clements, Russ Cochran, Jim Colbert, Frank Conner, John Cook, Fred Couples, Ben Crenshaw, Jim Dent, Mike Donald, Bob Eastwood, Danny Edwards, David Edwards, Dave Eichelberger, Lee Elder, Nick Faldo, Brad Faxon, Keith Fergus, Ed Fiori, Bruce Fleisher, Raymond Floyd, Dan Forsman, John Fought, Buddy Gardner, Al Geiberger, Gibby Gilbert, Bob Gilder, David Graham, Lou Graham, Thomas Gray, Hubert Green, Ken Green, Jay Haas, Gary Hallberg, Dan Halldorson, Donnie Hammond, Phil Hancock, Morris Hatalsky, Mark Hayes, Vance Heafner, Lon Hinkle, Scott Hoch, Joe Inman, Hale Irwin, Peter Jacobsen, Barry Jaeckel, Tom Jenkins, Tom Kite, Gary Koch, Ralph Landrum, Bernhard Langer, Wayne Levi, Steven Liebler, Bruce Lietzke, Pat Lindsey, Mark Lye, John Mahaffey, Roger Maltbie, Gary McCord, Mike McCullough, Mark McCumber, Pat McGowan, Allen Miller, Johnny Miller, Jeff Mitchell, Larry Mize, Griff Moody, Gil Morgan, Bob Murphy, Tsuneyuki Nakajima, Jim Nelford, Larry Nelson, Jack Nicklaus, Mike Nicolette, Greg Norman, Tim Norris, Andy North, Mac O'Grady, Mark O'Meara, David Ogrin, Peter Oosterhuis, Arnold Palmer, Jerry Pate, Corey Pavin, Mark Pfeil, Gary Player, Dan Pohl, Don Pooley, Greg Powers, Nick Price, Tom Purtzer, Sammy Rachels, Joey Rassett, Victor Regalado, Mike Reid, Jack Renner, Larry Rinker, Bill Rogers, Clarence Rose, Bill Sander, Bob Shearer, Tony Sills, Scott Simpson, Tim Simpson, Joey Sindelar, J. C. Snead, Ed Sneed, Craig Stadler, Payne Stewart, Dave Stockton, Curtis Strange, Ron Streck, Mike Sullivan, Hal Sutton, Doug Tewell, Leonard Thompson, Jim Thorpe, Lee Trevino, Bobby Wadkins, Lanny Wadkins, Denis Watson, Tom Watson, D. A. Weibring, Tom Weiskopf, Willie Wood, Richard Zokol

Round summaries

First round
Thursday, March 29, 1984

Source:

Second round
Friday, March 30, 1984

Source:

Third round
Saturday, March 31, 1984

Source:

Final round
Sunday, April 1, 1984

References

External links
The Players Championship website

1984
1984 in golf
1984 in American sports
1984 in sports in Florida
March 1984 sports events in the United States
April 1984 sports events in the United States